The Jutaí River is a river in Amazonas state in north-western Brazil.

Course

The river flows through the Juruá-Purus moist forests ecoregion.
The Jutaí river runs northeast before reaching its mouth on the southern bank of the Amazon River (Solimões section). 
It is west of the Juruá River, and is roughly parallel to the lower Juruá.

The  Cujubim Sustainable Development Reserve, established in 2003, lies on either side of the river in the municipality of Jutaí.
It is the largest conservation unit in Amazonas and the largest sustainable development reserve in the world.
Further downstream the river forms the boundary between the  Rio Jutaí Extractive Reserve, created in 2002, to the southeast and the Jutaí-Solimões Ecological Station to the northwest.

See also
List of rivers of Amazonas

References

Sources

Rivers of Amazonas (Brazilian state)
Tributaries of the Amazon River